Pedro Angel Cáceres (born 2 May 1960) is an Argentine middle-distance runner. He competed in the men's 3000 metres steeplechase at the 1984 Summer Olympics.

References

1960 births
Living people
Athletes (track and field) at the 1983 Pan American Games
Athletes (track and field) at the 1984 Summer Olympics
Argentine male middle-distance runners
Argentine male steeplechase runners
Olympic athletes of Argentina
Place of birth missing (living people)
Pan American Games competitors for Argentina
20th-century Argentine people